Roger Chatelain (born 23 April 1942) is a French rower. He competed at the 1964 Summer Olympics and the 1968 Summer Olympics.

References

External links
 

1942 births
Living people
French male rowers
Olympic rowers of France
Rowers at the 1964 Summer Olympics
Rowers at the 1968 Summer Olympics
Place of birth missing (living people)
World Rowing Championships medalists for France
20th-century French people